Bram Stoker's Dracula is a 1993 video game released for the Mega Drive/Genesis, Nintendo Entertainment System, Super NES, Game Boy, Master System, Sega CD, Game Gear, MS-DOS and Amiga games consoles. Based on the 1992 movie of the same name which in turn is based on the 1897 novel by Bram Stoker, each version of the game was an action-platformer except the Sega CD and Amiga versions which were beat 'em ups, and the DOS version which was a first-person shooter. The Amiga version was released in 1994 for North America and Europe. A CD-ROM version for DOS was released in 1995.

Gameplay
Each console has a different styled genre game based on the film, and in most games the single player character is Jonathan Harker, who is one of the main protagonists of the Dracula film, and the original novel by Bram Stoker, which the film was based on. Mina Harker, Jonathan's wife, is absent physically throughout each version of the game and only mentioned in the Sega CD version. However, Lucy Westenra, who was also in the novel and the film, is present in SNES, Sega Genesis, Sega CD, and Amiga versions of the game as a boss character, though in the original novel and the film, she was destroyed by her suitors and Abraham Van Helsing.

8-bit versions

Bram Stoker's Dracula for the Game Boy is a 1993 video game that bears a closer resemblance to platform games such as Super Mario Land than horror films.

The player controls a young lawyer named Jonathan Harker. Harker must free himself from Dracula's capture, follow him to London, and end his reign of terror. It was voted to be the 21st worst video game of all time according to FLUX magazine.

The game is also on the Nintendo Entertainment System. The gameplay is very similar to the Game Boy version, though the NES version has much smoother character animation, colors and better resolution. Master System and Game Gear versions of the game are also similar, but with a wider color palette and more shading effects.

16-bit versions
The release for the Super NES and Megadrive/Genesis releases were platforming action games that are identical to each other, but have a few alterations depending on the version. In the game, the player takes on the role of Jonathan Harker. Throughout the levels, Abraham Van Helsing will help Jonathan in his quest by providing advanced weapons. The game is of the side-scrolling genre. In the game, Jonathan Harker travels through six different stages (each having between a number of areas, except for the final stage which only has one area) and fights various bosses, such as Lucy Westenra as a vampiress, Count Dracula's three brides, Dracula's coach driver, Dracula's fire-breathing dragon, Renfield, and even Dracula himself in multiple forms, such as his bat form, his young form, his evil wolf form and finally his knight form. Levels in the game include the Romanian countryside, a rat-infested old village inn, Dracula's castle, Dracula's cavernous vaults, Dracula's misty catacombs, various locations in London, Lucy's crypt, a graveyard and Carfax Abbey.

Sega CD version
The release for Sega CD makes use of digitized backgrounds and includes full motion video (FMV) cutscenes from the film. Released exclusively in North America, the player controls Jonathan Harker as he travels through seven stages that are based on scenes from the film.

Amiga version
The release for the Amiga uses digitized graphics for characters that were recycled from the Sega CD game. However, the setup is quite different. There are nine stages in the game to play through. Each stage has a primary task that involves finding and destroying all the coffins that have Transylvanian earth inside, in order to advance in the game, but the last coffin to be destroyed is guarded by one of Dracula's stronger minions, in each stage. Like in the Sega CD game, Jonathan Harker has to punch and kick his enemies. The player can restore health by finding potions, and extra lives are available to pick up as well. Picking up Holy Crosses allows the player to fire a long-ranged holy beam attack, but only for a short period of time. Staircases and doors can be used to travel throughout each stage.

DOS version
The release for DOS is played from a first-person perspective, similar to other games like Doom or Wolfenstein 3D. In this version, Harker must traverse several large stages to locate and purify a varying number of coffins with holy wafers, while warding off various monsters with either a pistol or a knife. When all of the coffins in a stage are purified, Harker must then confront Dracula in one of three forms (his old man, young man, and original knight form).

Reception

Electronic Gaming Monthly gave the Sega CD version a 5.25 out of 10, commenting that the main character's movements are choppy, the battling with birds and bats is unimpressive and dull, and the full motion video sequences are so pixelated and blurry that it is difficult to make out what is going on. Computer Gaming World stated of the DOS version, "It appears that Psygnosis spent most of their Dracula budget on acquiring the movie license, leaving little for game development and packaging. The game play is uninspired and repetitious". The magazine recommended Veil of Darkness or Dracula Unleashed to vampire fans.

References

External links
 - Game Gear, Master System and NES
 - Amiga, Genesis/Mega-Drive and  SNES

1993 video games
1990s horror video games
Amiga games
Beat 'em ups
DOS games
Epic/Sony Records games
First-person shooters
Game Gear games
Master System games
Nintendo Entertainment System games
Platform games
Psygnosis games
Sega CD games
Sega Genesis games
Sony Pictures video games
Sprite-based first-person shooters
Super Nintendo Entertainment System games
Video games based on Dracula
Video games based on films
Video games based on adaptations
Video games developed in the United Kingdom
Video games scored by Jeroen Tel
Video games scored by Matt Furniss
Video games set in castles
Video games with 2.5D graphics